is a registered museum that opened in Akkeshi, Hokkaidō, Japan in 1988. The displays document the relationship between the town and the sea, with a particular focus on the fishing industry, and there is also a planetarium.

See also
 Hokkaido Museum
 Lake Akkeshi

References

External links
  Abashiri City Museum of Art

Akkeshi, Hokkaido
Museums in Hokkaido
Museums established in 1988
1988 establishments in Japan